Sussex Piscatorial Society (SPS) is a fishing club with waters in East and West Sussex and surrounding counties.  SPS was founded in 1891, and separate Coarse and Trout Sections were created in 1923.

Rudyard Kipling, author of The Jungle Book, was a member.

In 2007 SPS won recognition from the Wild Trout Trust for conservation work on their stretch of the River Itchen.

External links
Sussex Piscatorial Society web site 
Wild Trout Trust, SPS Upper Itchen Project
Sportswater display of historic sporting monograms and crests

Organizations established in 1891
Recreational fishing organizations
Recreational fishing in England
Sussex
1891 establishments in England